Karkaraly District is a district of Karaganda Region in central Kazakhstan. The administrative center of the district is the town of Karkaraly. As of 2019, the district is home to a population of 36,025 people.

Geography
Karasor, an endorheic salt lake, is located in the district, north of the Karkaraly and Kent mountain ranges.

History 
Discovered in 1985, the site includes a proto-city which spans 30 hectares, complementary farmland which exceeds 100 hectares in area, a religious building, and furnaces used to make bronze and possibly iron.

During the times of the Russian Empire, the town of Karkaraly was home to the Koyandy Fair, one of the largest economic and cultural gatherings in the Kazakh Steppes. Major figures who visited the town during the time of the Russian Empire included Abai Kunanbaev, Shoqan Walikhanov, Mikhail Prishvin, Grigory Potanin, Aleksandr Zatayevich, and Mukhtar Auezov.

Demographics 
The district reported 36,025 inhabitants as of 2019, of which most were ethnic Kazakhs.

References

Districts of Kazakhstan
Karaganda Region